Asia Pacific Center for Theoretical Physics (APCTP) is an international non-governmental research institute for physical sciences. It is located in the Campus of the Pohang University of Science and Technology (POSTECH), in Pohang, South Korea, and was founded in 1996 by Nobel Laureate Chen-Ning Yang.  Its previous presidents include Yang and Nobel Laureate Robert B. Laughlin.

Structure and history
The APCTP focuses on theoretical physics research, leading international programs in the Asia-Pacific region. It was founded in June 1996 as an international non-governmental organizations, with current member states: Australia, Canada, China, Japan, South Korea, Malaysia, the Philippines, Singapore, Taiwan, Thailand, Vietnam, Laos, Mongolia, India, Uzbekistan, Kazakhstan (16 countries).  Its multi-disciplinary research environment hosts scientists working on challenging problems at the forefront of biophysics, condensed matter, quantum information, astrophysics, cosmology and particle physics. The institute also plays a key role in Korea by inviting international scholars, acting as a conduit for collaboration through focus workshops and training young scientists.  In 2008, APCTP established Junior Research Groups (JRGs) under a previous president, Peter Fulde, in collaboration with the Max Planck Society in Germany, as a means to provide gifted young scientists with their first opportunity of managing research. The institute currently supports eight JRGs.

The APCTP is located at the Pohang University for Science and Technology (POSTECH), which in addition to possessing established departments in both mathematics and the natural sciences, ranks globally within the top 100 universities. Moreover, the boutique campus currently boasts the POSTECH-Max Planck center for quantum materials, as well as four centers from the Korean government flagship Institute for Basic Science program, spanning low-dimensional electronic systems, immunology, self-assembly and including the first mathematics IBS center.

See also
Pohang University of Science and Technology

External links
APCTP official webpage

Physics institutes
Pohang University of Science and Technology
Research institutes established in 1996
1996 establishments in South Korea
Theoretical physics institutes